The 1988 Giro d'Italia was the 71st edition of the Giro d'Italia, one of cycling's Grand Tours. The field consisted of 180 riders, and 125 riders finished the race.

By rider

By nationality

References

1988 Giro d'Italia
1988